= Copyright Society of China =

The Copyright Society of China (Chinese: 中国版权协会) is a Chinese scholarly society dedicated to studying copyright law. Its founding name was China Copyright Research Society (CCRS; Chinese: 中国版权研究会于) and it was founded on 9 March 1990. The organization was renamed to Copyright Society of China in 2002.
